Pere Pastor Vilanova (born 29 November 1968) is an Andorran judge and jurist. He was appointed in November 2015 as a judge of the European Court of Human Rights (ECHR) and elected Section President on the 19th september 2022.

Education 
Pere Pastor Vilanova graduated from Sciences Po Toulouse in 1990 with a degree in politics. He also holds a master’s degree in business, administrative and financial studies from the Montpellier Business School, which he obtained in 1992. He then continued his studies at the École nationale d’administration de Paris (promotion Saint-Exupéry) and was awarded a master’s degree in public administration in 1994. In 2002 he obtained a PhD in public law from the University of Toulouse 1 Capitole.

Professional career 
After three years as head of the Andorran Ministry of the Interior he became a trial judge (Batlle) in 1998. He held this position until October 2011, when he became the first judge of Andorran nationality to sit on the Supreme Court of Andorra. In parallel, between 2005 and 2015, he was a member of the Bioethics Committee (DH-BIO) of the Council of Europe.

In April 2015 he was elected by the Parliamentary Assembly of the Council of Europe to be a judge of the European Court of Human Rights. He took office on 1 November 2015 and will hold this position until the end of 2024. He was elected Section President on 19 September 2022 for a two-year term.

Since 2005, Pere Pastor Vilanova has also been a lecturer at the University of Toulouse 1 Capitole, mostly promoting Andorran law within the French university system.

Publications 
He is the author of several legal books and articles, notably on human rights, the environment and family and labour law.

References 

Judges of the European Court of Human Rights
1968 births
Living people
Andorran judges of international courts and tribunals